Olga Charvátová (born 11 June 1962 in Gottwaldov, now Zlín), also known Olga Křížová, is a retired Czech alpine skier who represented Czechoslovakia. At the 1984 Winter Olympics in Sarajevo, Charvátová won a bronze medal in the downhill event.

Individual victories

References

External links
 
 
 
 
 

1962 births
Living people
Sportspeople from Zlín
Czech female alpine skiers
Czechoslovak female alpine skiers
Olympic bronze medalists for Czechoslovakia
Olympic alpine skiers of Czechoslovakia
Alpine skiers at the 1984 Winter Olympics
Olympic medalists in alpine skiing
Medalists at the 1984 Winter Olympics
Universiade medalists in alpine skiing
Universiade gold medalists for Czechoslovakia
Universiade silver medalists for Czechoslovakia
Competitors at the 1983 Winter Universiade
Competitors at the 1985 Winter Universiade